Tetraneuris scaposa (common names stemmy four-nerve daisy and  stemmy hymenoxys) is a North American species of plants in the sunflower family. It grows in the southwestern and south-central United States (Nebraska, Kansas, Oklahoma, Kansas, Oklahoma, Texas, New Mexico, Arizona, Utah, Colorado) and northern Mexico (Chihuahua, Coahuila, Nuevo León, Tamaulipas, San Luis Potosí, Zacatecas).

Tetraneuris scaposa is a perennial herb up to 40 cm (16 inches) tall. It forms a branching underground caudex sometimes producing as many as 100 above-ground stems. Leaves are concentrated low on the stem, close to the ground. Flower heads can either be one on a stem, or clustered in tight clumps. Each head has 12–26 ray flowers surrounding 25–180 disc flowers.

Uses
The Zuni people use an infusion of it as an eyewash. The Zuni believe that this eyewash is not for people with a "bad heart".

References

External links
Photo of herbarium specimen collected in Nuevo León in 1992

scaposa
Flora of Mexico
Flora of the United States
Flora of the Great Plains (North America)
Plants used in traditional Native American medicine
Plants described in 1836
Taxa named by Edward Lee Greene